1,3-Diiminoisoindoline is a dye precursor used in the manufacture of phthalogen brilliant blue and IFG3M. The molecule can exist in different tautomers resulting in different crystalline solids.

References

Isoindolines